Earl E. Leslie was an American football and basketball coach.  He served as the head football coach for the Montclair State University Red Hawks in Upper Montclair, New Jersey. In two seasons as head coach, he compiled a record of 4–5.

Leslie played for the University of Oregon Ducks football team from 1919 to 1921 and participated in the 1920 Rose Bowl, where Oregon lost to Harvard. He later became an assistant coach for his alma mater in both football and men's basketball.

Leslie was the men's basketball head coach at Montclair State from 1930 to 1932 and at Penn State from 1932 to 1936, compiling an overall basketball coaching record of 41–47.

Head coaching record

Football

Basketball

|-

|-

References

Year of birth missing
Year of death missing
American football tackles
Montclair State Red Hawks football coaches
Montclair State Red Hawks men's basketball coaches
Oregon Ducks football coaches
Oregon Ducks football players
Oregon Ducks men's basketball coaches
Penn State Nittany Lions basketball coaches